Jefferson Kwamina Sackey (born 9 September 1978) is a Ghanaian journalist, media consultant, filmmaker, and PR strategist.

Early life and career
Sackey was born in Senya Beraku in the Awutu Senya District of Ghana, but grew up in Accra after moving there with his parents at a young age. He attended the Riis Memorial School for his Elementary and Junior High School Education. At the age of 9 he was featured on the popular kids' programmes 'Children's Own’ and ‘By the Fire Side’ on Ghana Television, and in the late nineties, whilst he was still in secondary school, he hosted the magazine programme, ‘Teen Beat’. In 1994, he continued his high school education at Accra High School. He later enrolled at the Ghana Institute of Journalism, and the Deutsche Welle TV Training Institute in Berlin, Germany.

Career
Sackey started working for Television Africa in 2005 as a lead news anchor. He then went on to host his global affairs show "JS International Assignment" which later became "Jefferson Sackey Reports", a news documentary production that aimed to tell in-depth stories which showcased many different points of view. Although the show started on TV Africa, it later was shown on Joy News, Ghana and other global news channels including Afroglobal Television in Canada.

He served as the Public Relations Officer for Ghana's Ministry of Foreign Affairs from 2006 to 2007 working closely with President Nana Addo Dankwa Akufo-Addo, then the Foreign Minister under the JA Kufuor administration. During the 2007 NPP Primaries, Jefferson released the documentary, "Pushing the Ghanaian and African Agenda" a feature that highlights the diplomatic and international strength of the then-candidate Nana Akuffo-Addo. Jefferson has also worked and reported for global news firms such as CNN International as a contributor of "World View" and Deutsche Welle Television as a West African Correspondent and contributor of its international affairs programme "Quadriga".

His media career also includes working for Multimedia Group as a News Anchor for the “Midday News”. He also worked as Assistant News Editor until his relocation to Canada in 2015, where he was appointed Vice President of Afroglobal Television in Canada. He has also worked for CNN International, and contributed to the “World View” and Deutsche Welle Television as a West African Correspondent.

Awards 

 
|-
|| 2012 ||| Radio and Television Personality Awards || Best Correspondent of the Year ||  
|-
|| 2015 ||| African Entertainment Awards || The Media Excellence Award ||  
|-
|| 2015 ||| Planet Africa Media Award || The Volunteer Award ||  
|-
|| 2015–2016 ||| Massey || College Gordon N Fisher/JHR Fellowship Awards || 
|-
|| 2014 ||| Honorary Doctorate Award || Day Spring Christian University, USA || 
|-
|}

References
 http://www.modernghana.com/news/640994/1/multimedias-jefferson-sackey-receives-2015-aea-med.html
 http://www.beeyoutube.com/video/kuHEeQT3hTA
 http://www.afroglobaltelevision.com/portfolio-item/jefferson-sackey-reports/
 http://www.ghanaweb.com/GhanaHomePage/entertainment/Pushing-The-Ghanaian-And-African-Agenda-Premiered-In-Accra-134762
 http://www.ghanaiantimes.com.gh/ghana60-logo-not-plagiarised-jefferson-sackey/
 http://blackottawascene.com/2015-planet-africa-awards-gala-a-great-success/
 http://www.modernghana.com/news/640994/1/multimedias-jefferson-sackey-receives-2015-aea-med.html
 http://www.beeyoutube.com/video/kuHEeQT3hTA
 http://www.afroglobaltelevision.com/portfolio-item/jefferson-sackey-reports/
 http://www.ghanaweb.com/GhanaHomePage/entertainment/Pushing-The-Ghanaian-And-African-Agenda-Premiered-In-Accra-134762
 http://www.myjoyonline.com/news/2015/september-6th/multimedias-jefferson-sackey-receives-2015-aea-media-excellence-award.php?comments
 http://www.africametro.com/western-africa/ghanaian-journalist-jefferson-sackey-wins-international-award
 http://www.ghanaweb.com/GhanaHomePage/NewsArchive/Kwesi-Twum-Begs-Metro-239153
 http://www.newsghana.com.gh/us-varsity-honours-jefferson-kwamina-sackey/
 http://www.peacefmonline.com/pages/local/news/201509/255243.php
 http://allafrica.com/stories/200606280207.html
 http://ameyawdebrah.com/kwami-sefa-kayi-wins-best-radio-and-tv-personality-for-second-year-running/
 http://myjoyonline.com/marticles/news/multimedias-jefferson-sackey-receives-2015-aea-media-excellence-award
 http://www.ghanaiantimes.com.gh/ghana60-logo-not-plagiarised-jefferson-sackey/
 http://ghanapoliticsonline.com/anas-reveals-collaboration-with-mahama/
 http://states-tv.com/don-moen-reveals-how-much-he-took-for-his-upcoming-ghana60-concert/
 http://www.firstdigitalghana.com/hearts-kotoko-clash-in-ghana-60-presidents-cup/
 http://www.ghananewsagency.org/print/3444
http://ghanareporters.com/2012/10/14/blakk-rasta-jefferson-sackey-drive-time-win-at-rtp-awards/
http://ghanavibes.com/jefferson-sackey-dblack-reggie-rockstone-others-new-season-xlive-tv-show/
https://soundcloud.com/jefferson-sackey
https://www.africanewshub.com/news/1880954-jefferson-sackey-takes-a-doctorate-degree
https://www.rtbf.be/auvio/detail_jsr-anas-aremeyaw-anas-talks-to-jefferson-sackey?id=2046506
https://www.ghanamma.com/2014/09/18/photos-dr-jefferson-sackey-welcomed-to-canada/

1978 births
Living people
Ghanaian radio journalists
Ghanaian radio presenters